Vyškovce is a village and municipality in Stropkov District in the Prešov Region of north-eastern Slovakia.

History
In historical records the village was first mentioned in 1414.

Geography
The municipality lies at an altitude of 212 metres and covers an area of 6.621 km². It has a population of about 145 people.

References

External links
 
 
https://web.archive.org/web/20080111223415/http://www.statistics.sk/mosmis/eng/run.html 

Villages and municipalities in Stropkov District
Šariš